Rosenfors is a locality situated in Hultsfred Municipality, Kalmar County, Sweden, with 281 inhabitants in 2010.

References 

Populated places in Kalmar County
Populated places in Hultsfred Municipality